La Sal National Forest was established as the La Sal Forest Reserve by the U.S. Forest Service in Utah and Colorado on January 25, 1906 with , mostly in Utah. It became a National Forest on March 4, 1907. On July 1, 1908 it was combined with Monticello National Forest and renamed La Salle National Forest. On November 28, 1949 the forest was transferred to Manti National Forest. On August 28, 1958 the name was changed to Manti-La Sal National Forest.

La Sal's lands lie to the east of the Colorado River in southeastern Utah and western Colorado, and include the La Sal Mountains and Abajo Mountains. The forest lies overwhelmingly in San Juan County, Utah (84.19%), but is also in Grand County, Utah (10.75%), as well as Montrose (4.215%) and Mesa (0.85%) counties in Colorado. Its total area as of 30 September 2008 was 535,288 acres (2,166.2 km²). Its area represents 42.13% of the combined Manti-La Sal National Forest's total area. There are local ranger district offices in Moab and Monticello, although the combined Manti-La Sal National Forest's administrative offices are located more distantly in Price.

References

External links
 Manti La Sal National Forest
 Forest History Society
Listing of the National Forests of the United States and Their Dates (from Forest History Society website) Text from Davis, Richard C., ed. Encyclopedia of American Forest and Conservation History. New York: Macmillan Publishing Company for the Forest History Society, 1983. Vol. II, pp. 743-788.

Former National Forests of Utah
Former National Forests of Colorado